J. Selye University is the only Hungarian-language university in Slovakia. It was established in 2004 in Komárno (Hungarian: (Rév)Komárom) and it has three faculties. It is named after Hans Selye, a 20th-century Hungarian endocrinologist (see: Education in Slovakia). The number of students attending the university has increased from 1731 in 2015 to 1894 in 2020.

Faculties 

Faculty of Economics and Informatics
Faculty of Education
Faculty of Theology

Gallery

References

External links

 official web page

Education in Slovakia
Educational institutions established in 2004
2004 establishments in Slovakia
Hungarians in Slovakia